Bhrigupanth (Hindi: भृगुपंत) is a mountain of Garhwal Himalaya in Uttarakhand, India. It stands majestically at 6772 meter 22218 feet. It is the 38th highest located entirely within Uttarakhand. Nanda Devi is the highest mountain in this category. Bhrigupanth is the 525th highest peak in the world. It is located northeast of Thalay Sagar 6904 meter, northwest of Meru Peak 6660 meter and south of Manda III 6529 meter.

Climbing history
There are many attempts on this peak, few of them successful. Below is a list of successful attempts. 
 First ascent of Bhrigupanth happened in 1980 by Indian American Women's expedition led by Arlene Blum via south face. 
 A seven member Japanese team of the Senshu Alpine Club, Osaka, led by K. Yakamura, successful by the south face in 1982.
 In 1983 an 11-member Taiwanese team led by Huang Lee Chun-Jung. climbed from the west face. Climb followed by a tragedy death of two members and Sherpa Ang Pasang.
 In 1987 a 10-member Polish team from Warsaw made the first ascent of the west pillar route led by R. Kolakowski. They descended by the south face route. 
 In 1988 a 6-member Spanish team led by J. Vicente climbed the peak.

Glaciers and rivers
It is surrounded by Glaciers on all the side Kedar Bamak, on the western side, Bhrigupanth Bamak on the eastern side and Kirti Bamak on the south east. The famous Kedar Tal is near Kedar Bamak. Kedar Ganga emerges from Kedar Bamak and it merges with Bhagirathi river at Gangotri.

Neighboring peaks
The neighboring peaks of Bhrigupanth: 
 Thalay Sagar: 
 Meru Peak: 
 Manda III: 
 Shivling: 
 Jogin:

References

Mountains of Uttarakhand
Six-thousanders of the Himalayas
Geography of Chamoli district